Male Žablje is a settlement on the right bank of the Vipava River, south of Vipavski Križ, in the Municipality of Ajdovščina in the Littoral region of Slovenia.

Name
The name Male Žablje literally means 'little Žablje', contrasting with neighboring Velike Žablje (literally, 'big Žablje'). Like related toponyms (e.g., Žabnica, Žabče, and Žablje), the name is derived from the Slovene common noun žaba 'frog', referring to a settlement near a wetland where frogs live.

References

External links 

Male Žablje at Geopedia

Populated places in the Municipality of Ajdovščina